Sun (Italian: Sole) is a 1929 Italian silent drama film directed by Alessandro Blasetti and starring Marcello Spada, Vasco Creti and Dria Paola. The film was set around the planned draining of the Pontine Marshes by Benito Mussolini's Fascist government. It was shot partly on location, which added a sense of realism. Mussolini was impressed by the result and described it as "the dawn of the Fascist film".

The film was destroyed during the Second World War, and survives only in still photographs.

Cast
 Marcello Spada as Ing. Rinaldi 
 Vasco Creti as Marco 
 Dria Paola as Giovanna 
 Vittorio Vaser as Silvestro 
 Lia Bosco as Barbara 
 Anna Vinci 
 Rolando Costantino  
 Rinaldo Rinaldi   
 Arcangelo Aversa  
 Arnaldo Baldaccini  
 Sante Bonaldo  
 Vittorio Gonzi   
 Igino Nunzio

References

Bibliography
 Bondanella, Peter E. Italian Cinema: From Neorealism to the Present. Continuum International Publishing Group, 2001.
 Reich, Jacqueline & Garofalo, Piero. Re-Viewing Fascism: Italian Cinema, 1922 to 1943. Indiana University Press, 2002.

External links

1929 films
1929 drama films
Italian silent feature films
Italian drama films
1920s Italian-language films
Films directed by Alessandro Blasetti
Films set in Italy
Films shot in Italy
Lost Italian films
Italian black-and-white films
1929 lost films
Lost drama films
Silent drama films
1920s Italian films